Zeeman is a surname. Notable people with the surname include:

 Pieter Zeeman (1865–1943), Dutch physicist and 1902 Nobel laureate, discoverer of the Zeeman effect
 Reinier Nooms (aka "Zeeman"), (c.1623–1664), a Dutch painter, etcher and engraver
 Christopher Zeeman (1925–2016), mathematician
 Carling Zeeman (born 1991), Canadian rower
 Michaël Zeeman (1958–2009), prominent Dutch journalist, author, editor, columnist and literary critic
 Nicolette Zeeman (born 1956), British literary scholar
 Richard Zeeman, a fictional character in the Anita Blake: Vampire Hunter series of novels by Laurell K. Hamilton